Mohamed Larbi Zitout, is an Algerian political commentator and former diplomat, born on 29 July 1963 in Laghouat, Algeria.

Biography
By 1995, he was a civil servant in Libya. In 1995, however - three years into the Algerian Civil War - he resigned from his position and emigrated to the United Kingdom

He has been interviewed or appeared  commentator in a number of newspapers and broadcast media, such as the BBC, ABC and Al-Jazeera, and has contributed chapters to An Inquiry into the Algerian Massacres ("Les Régimes Arabes et le Conflit Algérien", p. 847) and Quelle réconciliation pour l'Algérie? ("La reconciliation passe par réhabilitation des victimes, de la nation et de l'Etat", p. 121.)  He is a founding member of Justitia Universalis, a human rights organisation set up in 2001 dedicated to fighting impunity.

References

External links
 Newspaper archive about Mohamed Zitout
 Mohamed Larbi Zitout official site

1963 births
Living people
Algerian activists
Algerian diplomats
Algerian dissidents
Ambassadors of Algeria to Libya
Algerian emigrants to the United Kingdom
People of the 2010–2012 Algerian protests